Emajõe Business Centre (colloquially "Plasku" or "Pläsku") is a business centre in Tartu, Estonia. The centre is located at the Emajõgi river.

The centre was opened in 1998. The centre has 14 storeys and its height is 52 m.

References

External links
 Emajõe Business Centre, estiko.ee

Buildings and structures in Tartu